Devecser is a town in Veszprém County, Hungary.

In the Middle Ages there were five villages in the area of today's Devecser: Devecser, Kisdevecser, Szék, Meggyes, and Patony. These villages expanded in the 12th and 13th century. There is an Esterházy castle in the town.

History 

While the Ottomans occupied most of central Europe, the region north of lake Balaton remained in the Kingdom of Hungary (1538–1867) (captaincy between Balaton and Drava).  Until 1918, DEVECSER was part of the Austrian monarchy, province of Hungary; in Transleithania after the compromise of 1867 in the Kingdom of Hungary.

During World War II, Devecser was captured by Soviet troops of the 3rd Ukrainian Front on 26 March 1945 in the course of the Vienna Offensive.

Industrial accident

In October 2010, a sludge reservoir at the Ajka aluminum plant burst its banks, killing at least four people and injuring more than 120. Part of the town had to be erased due to the soil contamination, leading to the removal of some houses.

References

External links 

  in Hungarian

Populated places in Veszprém County